'Dr Marcus Conyers''' is an author and developer of graduate degree programs focused on improving leading and learning by bridging mind, brain, and implementation research to practice. Conyers is the coauthor, with Donna Wilson, of 20 books in this field, including Smarter Teacher Leadership: Neuroscience and the Power of Purposeful Collaboration (Teachers College Press, 2016), Teaching Students to Drive Their Brains: Metacognitive Strategies, Activities and Lesson Ideas (ASCD, 2016), Positively Smarter: Science and Strategies for Increasing Happiness, Achievement, and Well-Being (Wiley-Blackwell, 2015), Five Big Ideas for Effective Teaching: Connecting Mind, Brain, and Education Research to Classroom Practice (Teachers College Press, 2020), and Flourishing in the First Five Years: Connecting Implications from Mind, Brain, and Education Research to the Development of Young Children (Rowman & Littlefield Education, 2013).

Conyers is the lead developer of the doctoral minor in Brain-Based Leadership and co-developer of the Master of Science and Educational Specialist degree programs with a major in Brain-Based Teaching with the Abraham S. Fischler School of Education at Nova Southeastern University. Conyers serves as a subject matter supervisor for the Ph.D. in Professional Practice: Psychological Perspectives with Canterbury Christ Church University. Conyers presents at leadership and educational conferences in the United States and internationally and blogs regularly on Edutopia and Edweek. Conyers is co-founder of the nonprofit Center for Innovative Education and Prevention (CIEP) and founder of BrainSMART.

 Philosophy 
From the beginning of his career, Conyers has shared a philosophy that virtually every human being has vast untapped cognitive potential and that effective leadership supports the transformation of this potential into higher levels of performance and well-being. His work has focused on improving leading, learning, and teaching by bridging implications of relevant brain science and cognitive psychology to practice. Additionally, in the field of education, Conyers has focused on empowering educators with the knowledge and skills they need to help all students learn the metacognitive, cognitive, and social-emotional skills required to reach more of their unique potential and to thrive in the global innovation economy. His work with tens of thousands of educational leaders and educators is informed by a synergy of education, mind, and relevant brain research. He is the developer of the original BrainSMART model, which offers practical strategies designed to help students maintain a healthy and optimistic state for learning, to make lessons meaningful, to maintain students’ focus and attention on learning, to retain what they have learned, and to transfer and demonstrate their new knowledge in assessments and real-life applications. He also codeveloped Thinking for Results, a process for equipping students with the cognitive tools they need to actualize their learning potential.

 Education and professional experience 
Conyers earned his Ph.D. at the University of Westminster. The focus of Conyers's thesis was improving practice through education, mind, and selected brain research. The thesis for Conyers's MSc with the University of Huddersfield was on cardiovascular health promotion through the application of the learning sciences and social marketing strategies.

Conyers was the lead consultant for two educational research projects: 
The implementation of an original brain-based teaching approach supported by a Challenge Grant from the Annenberg Foundation with Florida Atlantic University 
A three-year, statewide Florida Department of Education initiative on brain-based teaching, Scholarships for Teachers in Action Research (STAR).

The effectiveness of the latter initiative led to the development of Master of Science and Educational Specialist degrees with a major in Brain-Based Teaching through Nova Southeastern University. Conyers considers brain-based teaching to be an approach to instruction that acknowledges that learning changes the structure and function of the brain and that educational and cognitive research can be used to enhance classroom teaching practice.Hardiman, M. M., & Denckla, M. B. (2010). The science of education: Informing teaching and learning through the brain sciences. In Cerebrum 2010: Emerging ideas in brain science. Washington, DC: Dana Press.

Conyers presents internationally at conferences with educational institutions, including the University of Cambridge in the United Kingdom, Leiden University in The Netherlands, University of Dubai, the South African Principals Association, the Singapore Teachers Union, and universities across the United States and Canada.

 References 

 Further reading 
Conyers, M. A. (2017). Improving teaching practice through education, mind, and selected brain research [Ph.D. thesis]. The University of Westminster. http://westminsterresearch.wmin.ac.uk/19224/1/Conyers_Marcus_thesis.pdf
Conyers, M. A. (November, 2014). Education for students' futures. Part 16: Innovating Minds—What Students Need for the Future. Information Age Newsletter, 149.
Conyers, M. A. (November, 2015). Fit brains for the future: How exercise supports cognitive function, learning, and cardiovascular health. Information Age Education Newsletter, 174.
Conyers, M. A., & Wilson, D. L. (2000). BrainSMART 60 strategies for boosting test scores (Fischler School of Education at Nova Southeastern University Series). Orlando, FL: BrainSMART.
Conyers, M. A., & Wilson, D. L. (2006). BrainSMART in the house (2nd ed.). Orlando, FL: BrainSMART.
Conyers, M. A., & Wilson, D. L. (2009). Introduction to BrainSMART HealthWise (2nd ed.). Orlando, FL: BrainSMART.
Conyers, M. A., & Wilson, D. L. (2015). Positively smarter: Science and strategies for increasing happiness, achievement, and well-being. West Sussex, UK: Wiley Blackwell.
Conyers, M. A., & Wilson, D. L. (2015, May). Smart moves: Powering up the brain with physical activity. Phi Delta Kappan, 96(8), 38-42. DOI: 10.1177/0031721715583961
Conyers, M. A., & Wilson, D. L. (2016). Smarter teacher leadership: Neuroscience and the power of purposeful collaboration. New York, NY: Teachers College Press.
Conyers, M. A., Heverly, L., & Wilson, D. L. (1999). BrainSMART early start. Orlando, FL: BrainSMART.
Wilson, D. L. & Conyers, M. A., (2013). Effective teaching, successful students (Fischler School of Education at Nova Southeastern University Series, 2nd ed.) [Kindle version]. Orlando, FL: BrainSMART.
Wilson, D. L., & Conyers, M. A. (2009). Wiring the brain to read: Beginning reading preK–grade 3 (Fischler School of Education at Nova Southeastern University Series). Orlando, FL: BrainSMART.
Wilson, D. L., & Conyers, M. A. (2010). Administrator’s workbook for increasing student achievement: BrainSMART strategies for leading and teaching (Fischler School of Education at Nova Southeastern University Series). Orlando, FL: BrainSMART.
Wilson, D. L., & Conyers, M. A. (2010). Courageous learners: Increasing student achievement in diverse learning communities (Fischler School of Education at Nova Southeastern University Series, 3rd ed.). Orlando, FL: BrainSMART.
Wilson, D. L., & Conyers, M. A. (2010). Wiring the brain to read: Brain-based differentiated reading instruction (Fischler School of Education at Nova Southeastern University Series). Orlando, FL: BrainSMART.
Wilson, D. L., & Conyers, M. A. (2010). Wiring the brain to read: Higher-order thinking for reading (Fischler School of Education at Nova Southeastern University Series). Orlando, FL: BrainSMART.
Wilson, D. L., & Conyers, M. A. (2011). Thinking for results: Strategies for increasing student achievement by as much as 30 percent (Fischler School of Education at Nova Southeastern University Series, 4th ed.). Orlando, FL: BrainSMART.
Wilson, D. L., & Conyers, M. A. (2020). Five big ideas for effective teaching: Connecting mind, brain, and education research to classroom practice. New York, NY: Teachers College Press.
Wilson, D. L., & Conyers, M. A. (2013). Flourishing in the first five years: Connecting implications from mind, brain, and education research to the development of young children. Lanham, MD: Rowman and Littlefield Education.
Wilson, D. L., & Conyers, M. A. (2013, December). Understanding and mastering complexity: The five new cognitive complexities that teachers confront. Information Age Education Newsletter, 127.
Wilson, D. L., & Conyers, M. A. (2014, October). The boss of my brain. Educational leadership, 72(2).
Wilson, D. L., & Conyers, M. A. (2016). Teaching students to drive their brains: Metacognitive strategies, activities and lesson ideas. Alexandria VA: ASCD.
Wilson, D. L., & Conyers, M. A. (2018). Introduction to BrainSMART teaching: Science, structures, and strategies for increasing student learning. Cheltenham, Australia: Hawker Brownlow Education.
Wilson, D. L., & Conyers, M. C. (2011). BrainSMART 60 strategies for increasing student learning'' (4th ed.). Orlando, FL: BrainSMART.

External links 
BrainSMART, Inc.
Center for Innovative Education and Prevention
Edutopia

British health and wellness writers
Educational researchers
Education writers
Living people
Year of birth missing (living people)